The Morris County Vocational School District is a countywide public school district that provides vocational and technical education to public high school students in Morris County, New Jersey, United States. The district is headquartered in Denville Township.

As of the 2019–20 school year, the district, comprised of six schools, had an enrollment of 1,123 students and 72.5 classroom teachers (on an FTE basis), for a student–teacher ratio of 15.5:1.

The district and its schools are accredited by the Middle States Association of Colleges and Schools Commission on Elementary and Secondary Schools.

Schools
Schools in the district (with 2019–20 enrollment data from the National Center for Education Statistics) are:
 Academy for Sports Medicine at Roxbury High School in Succasunna with NA students in grades 9-12
 Academy for Environmental Science at Jefferson Township High School in Oak Ridge with 54 students in grades 9-12
 Academy for Mathematics, Science, and Engineering at Morris Hills High School in Rockaway with 164 students in grades 9-12
 Academy for Performing Arts at Morris Knolls High School in Rockaway (78; 9-12)
 Morris County School of Technology in Denville Township with 807 students in grades 9-12

Administration
Core members of the district's administration are:
Scott Moffitt, Superintendent
James Rollo, Business Administrator / Board Secretary

Board of education
The district's board of education, comprised of five members, sets policy and oversees the fiscal and educational operation of the district through its administration. As a Type I school district, the board's trustees are appointed by the Morris County Board of County Commissioners to serve three-year terms of office on a staggered basis, with either one or two seats up for reappointment each year. The board appoints a superintendent to oversee the day-to-day operation of the district.

References

External links
Morris County Vocational School District

Data for the Morris County Vocational School District, National Center for Education Statistics

Denville Township, New Jersey
School districts in Morris County, New Jersey
Vocational school districts in New Jersey